Azea Augustama (born August 2, 1983) is a Haitian boxer who qualified for the 2008 Olympic Games at light-heavyweight through a bronze medal finish at the second Americas qualifier. In 2008 he also won the National Golden Gloves.

Professional career
At the 2007 PanAm Games Augustama lost in the quarter final. At the 2007 World Championships he competed at 201 lbs, while his younger brother Elie competed at 178. Both lost their first bouts, and Azea dropped down to 178 afterwards. His older brother Emmanuel fights at super heavyweight. All three brothers and their father work in a construction company.

At the first Olympic qualifier he was shut out 0-11 by Carlos Negron. At the second, he lost to PanAm Champion Eleider Alvarez in the semifinal bout but defeated Mexican Ventura Vasquez in the all-important third place match. As of October 2007, his record was 60-10.

The Augustamas have lived in Florida since 1990 and Azea won the local Florida Golden Gloves. The other brothers, however, do not possess dual citizenship. In 2008 he was able to compete in the National Golden Gloves Tournament of Champions as a non-citizen and won the tournament.

As of late 2014, Augustama has 20 fights as a professional, with 18 wins and 2 decision losses to Edwin Rodríguez and Denis Grachev.

Professional boxing record

|-
|align="center" colspan=8|18 Wins (10 knockouts, 8 decisions), 2 Losses (0 knockout), 0 Draw
|-
| align="center" style="border-style: none none solid solid; background: #e3e3e3"|Res.
| align="center" style="border-style: none none solid solid; background: #e3e3e3"|Record
| align="center" style="border-style: none none solid solid; background: #e3e3e3"|Opponent
| align="center" style="border-style: none none solid solid; background: #e3e3e3"|Type
| align="center" style="border-style: none none solid solid; background: #e3e3e3"|Round
| align="center" style="border-style: none none solid solid; background: #e3e3e3"|Date
| align="center" style="border-style: none none solid solid; background: #e3e3e3"|Location
| align="center" style="border-style: none none solid solid; background: #e3e3e3"|Notes
|-align=center
|Win
|18–2
| align=left| Andy Perez
|  ||||
|align=left| 
|align=left|
|-align=center
|Loss
|17–2
| align=left| Edwin Rodríguez
|  ||||
|align=left| 
|align=left|
|-align=center
|Win
|17–1
| align=left| Cory Cummings
|  ||||
|align=left| 
|align=left|
|-align=center
|Win
|16–1
| align=left| Jermain Mackey
|  ||||
|align=left| 
|align=left|
|-align=center
|Win
|15–1
| align=left| Rayco Saunders
|  ||||
|align=left| 
|align=left|
|-align=center
|Win
|14–1
| align=left| David McNemar
|  ||||
|align=left| 
|align=left|
|-align=center
|Win
|13–1
| align=left| Grover Young
|  ||||
|align=left| 
|align=left|
|-align=center
|Win
|12–1
| align=left| Frank Armstrong
|  ||||
|align=left| 
|align=left|
|-align=center
|Win
|11–1
| align=left| Billy Bailey
|  ||||
|align=left| 
|align=left|
|-align=center
|Win
|10–1
| align=left| JC Peterson
|  ||||
|align=left| 
|align=left|
|-align=center
|Loss
|9–1
| align=left| Denis Grachev
|  ||||
|align=left| 
|align=left|
|-align=center
|Win
|9–0
| align=left| Reggie Pena
|  ||||
|align=left| 
|align=left|
|-align=center
|Win
|8–0
| align=left| William Gill
|  ||||
|align=left| 
|align=left|
|-align=center
|Win
|7–0
| align=left| Adam Collins
|  ||||
|align=left| 
|align=left|
|-align=center
|Win
|6–0
| align=left| Kia Daniels
|  ||||
|align=left| 
|align=left|
|-align=center
|Win
|5–0
| align=left| Amador Acevedo
|  ||||
|align=left| 
|align=left|
|-align=center
|Win
|4–0
| align=left| Aneudy Martes
|  ||||
|align=left| 
|align=left|
|-align=center
|Win
|3–0
| align=left| Victor Rudd
|  ||||
|align=left| 
|align=left|
|-align=center
|Win
|2–0
| align=left| Ronald Garr
|  ||||
|align=left| 
|align=left|
|-align=center
|Win
|1–0
| align=left| Ousman McClain
| ||||
|align=left|
|align=left|
|-align=center

Personal life

Legal issues 
In 2022 Augustama was arrested for allegedly threatening a mass shooting at a gym in Miami before putting down a deposit for an AK-47 rifle. The gym had previously revoked Augustama's membership.

References

External links
2nd Qualifier
World 2007
Article
Golden

1983 births
Haitian male boxers
Light-heavyweight boxers
Living people
Boxers at the 2008 Summer Olympics
Olympic boxers of Haiti
Boxers at the 2007 Pan American Games
Pan American Games competitors for Haiti
American male boxers
Sportspeople from Port-au-Prince
Boxers from Florida